Clifford Nazarro (January 31, 1904 – February 18, 1961) was an American double-talk comedian of the 1930s and 1940s who appeared in films such as You'll Never Get Rich (1941) as Swivel Tongue with Fred Astaire and Rita Hayworth, In Old Colorado (1941) as Nosey Haskins with William Boyd, and Hillbilly Blitzkrieg (1942) as Barney Google.

A comment in a 1942 newspaper article summed up Nazarro's varied talents: "He played all sorts of roles in stock companies, was a versatile actor in musical comedy and vaudeville, is one of the top masters-of-ceremony in show business, and was a serious vocalist on the radio."

Nazarro was the voice of Warner Bros. Cartoons' cartoon character "Egghead". He made a few commercial recordings, including a 1932 date as vocalist with swing band Roane's Pennsylvanians and a 1942 comic recitation, "News of the World."
He made several uncredited appearances on the Jack Benny Program during the 1930s and early 1940s.

Partial filmography

Modern Minstrels (1930)
Billboard Frolics (1935) - Eddie Camphor / Worm (voice, uncredited)
Romance Rides the Range (1936) - 'Shorty'
The Singing Buckaroo (1937) - Gabby
Behind the Mike (1937) - Messenger Boy (uncredited)
Thoroughbreds Don't Cry (1937) - Tubby Wells (uncredited)
Outside of Paradise (1938) - Cliff
The Penguin Parade (1938) - Penguin Presenter (voice, uncredited)
A Desperate Adventure (1938) - Tipo
Wholly Smoke (1938) - Bing Crosby Cigar / Rudy Vallee Cigar (voice, uncredited)
Stablemates (1938) - Cliff (uncredited)
Artists and Models Abroad (1938) - Guide (uncredited)
St. Louis Blues (1939) - Shorty
King of the Turf (1939) - 1st Tout
Forged Passport (1939) - 'Shakespeare'
Believe It or Else (1939) - Narrator (voice, uncredited)
Slap-Happy Pappy (1940) - Bing Crosby / Eddie Cackler (voice, uncredited)
Grandpa Goes to Town (1940) - (uncredited)
The Crooked Road (1940) - Minor (uncredited)
Scatterbrain (1940) - Double-Talker (uncredited)
Sing, Dance, Plenty Hot (1940) - Double-Talker (uncredited)
Arise, My Love (1940) - Botzelberg
Mr. Dynamite (1941) - Little Man
In Old Colorado (1941) - Nosey Haskins
Melody for Three (1941) - Mortimer Effington, sound effects demonstrator (uncredited)
Rookies on Parade (1941) - Joe Martin
Porky's Preview (1941) - Al Jolson caricature (voice, uncredited)
Farm Frolics (1941) - Cantor Horse (voice, uncredited)
Dive Bomber (1941) - Corps Man
World Premiere (1941) - Peters
You'll Never Get Rich (1941) - Swivel Tongue
Sailors on Leave (1941) - Mike
New York Town (1941) - Burt's Companion (uncredited)
The Night of January 16th (1941) - Gas Station Attendant
Blondie Goes to College (1942) - Professor Mixwell, The Double Talker (uncredited)
Pardon My Stripes (1942) - Nutsy
Hillbilly Blitzkrieg (1942) - Barney Google
Call of the Canyon (1942) - Pete Murphy
Rhythm Parade (1942) - Rocks MacDougal
Shantytown (1943) - 'Shortcake'
Trocadero (1944) - Cliff
Swing Hostess (1944) - Bobo
I'm from Arkansas (1944) - Willie Childs
Ding Dong Williams (1946) - Zing
Gentleman Joe Palooka (1946) - First Character
Blue Skies (1946) - Cliff - Piano Player (uncredited)
Curtain Razor (1949) - Frankie the Rooster (voice, uncredited)

References

External links

1904 births
1961 deaths
20th-century American comedians
20th-century American male actors
Male actors from New Haven, Connecticut
Male Western (genre) film actors
Vaudeville performers
Warner Bros. Cartoons voice actors